KVPA-LD, virtual channel 42 (UHF digital channel 34), is a low-powered Estrella TV-owned-and-operated television station licensed to Phoenix, Arizona, United States. The station is owned by Estrella Media of Burbank, California.

History
An original construction permit for what is now KVPA-LP was granted to Broadcast Systems, Inc. on March 21, 1995 as K24EI in Phoenix, to broadcast on channel 24.  The original transmitter location was on Usery Mountain in east Mesa, and the station was first licensed November 15, 1996.  Early programming is unknown, but later, the station aired the same programming, Home Shopping Network, as K25DM, which at the time was also owned by Broadcasting Systems, Inc.  Although it aired the same programming, K24EI was never a translator of K25DM.

In November 2000, K24EI submitted an application to the FCC to move to channel 42, as Phoenix independent station KTVK was beginning to build its DTV facilities on channel 24. The application was approved, and in November 2002, the new facilities were licensed with call sign K42FD. At about the same time, the station changed its programming to the Shop at Home Network.

In April 2005, the station's owners signed an agreement to sell KDMA Channel 25, Inc., the parent company of K42FD, to Latin America Broadcasting, Inc., with the intent of launching a new Spanish-language network called LAT TV. K42FD's sister station, K25DM, was supposed to be part of that network, with K42FD retaining its Shop at Home programming initially, then eventually switching over. However, after the deal was consummated in July 2005, the new owners decided instead to launch LAT TV on K42FD. The station received new call letters KVPA-LP in December 2005, and at the same time, Latin America Broadcasting applied to move KVPA-LP's transmitter location to the South Mountain antenna farm. That application was granted in April 2006 and KVPA-LP went silent. It re-emerged in June 2006 with the new LAT TV programming. LAT TV and KVPA-LP ceased operations in mid-May 2008, but the station's owners retained the license.

On August 18, 2008, the former owners of LAT TV announced that KVPA-LP would be sold to Liberman Broadcasting (which was renamed Estrella Media in February 2020, following a corporate reorganization of the company under private equity firm HPS Investment Partners, LLC), a company that specializes in Spanish-language television and radio, for $1.25 million. The sale was finalized on December 30.

Digital channels

References

External links
 

VPA-LD
Low-power television stations in the United States
Estrella Media stations